Munever Rizvić (born November 4, 1973) is a Bosnian professional football manager and former player who was most recently the manager of First League of FBiH club Budućnost Banovići, a position he was at from September 2012 until January 2020.

International career
He made his debut for Bosnia and Herzegovina in a January 1999 friendly match away against Malta and has earned a total of 10 caps (2 unofficial), scoring no goals. His final international was a September 2002 European Championship qualification match against Romania.

Managerial statistics

Honours

Player
Olimpik
Second League of FBiH - South: 1999–00

Manager
Budućnost Banovići
First League of FBiH: 2009–10
Second League of FBiH - North: 2017–18, 2018–19

References

External links

1973 births
Living people
Sportspeople from Tuzla
Association football defenders
Bosnia and Herzegovina footballers
Bosnia and Herzegovina international footballers
FK Budućnost Banovići players
FK Olimpik players
FC Moscow players
FC Aktobe players
First League of the Federation of Bosnia and Herzegovina players
Premier League of Bosnia and Herzegovina players
Russian Premier League players
Kazakhstan Premier League players
Bosnia and Herzegovina expatriate footballers
Expatriate footballers in Russia
Bosnia and Herzegovina expatriate sportspeople in Russia
Expatriate footballers in Kazakhstan
Bosnia and Herzegovina expatriate sportspeople in Kazakhstan
Bosnia and Herzegovina football managers
Premier League of Bosnia and Herzegovina managers